The Battle of One Tree Hill was one of a series of conflicts that took place between European settlers and a group of men of the Jagera and other Aboriginal groups in the Darling Downs area in the colony of Queensland in the 1840s, as part of the Australian frontier wars. It was one in which the settlers were routed by a group of local Aboriginal men under the warrior Multuggerah, a rare event both in its form, as pitched battles between the two groups, and in its outcome.

Background
Moreton Bay was somewhat settled prior to the battle, due to a penal settlement having been established in 1824. The colonisers had some contact with the local Aboriginal groups but not the Jagera from the west. The little interaction that the Jagera had had with the settlers involved harbouring escaped convict, James Sterry Baker. From most accounts, Multuggerah, the leader of the Jagera nation in the 1830s and 1840s, was happy as long as the settlers didn't encroach into the Lockyer Valley.

However, by 1842 there were attempts to occupy land in and near the Lockyer Valley, Darling Downs and upper Brisbane areas. These were met with resistance from the local alliance of "mountain tribes" united under Multuggerah, a warrior, strategist and diplomat. After the 1842 deliberate poisoning of 50 or 60 Aboriginal people on Kilcoy Station, the resistance gathered momentum, and an uprising was planned. Multuggerah and his men began ambushing the mountain road that was the only route for bringing supplies from Brisbane to the Downs. The road had been built about two years earlier and was the only way of keeping both commerce and communication open between the Moreton Bay and Downs areas. Multuggerah and his forces planned to deprive the squatters of their supplies.

The battles

Ambush
In September 1843, a large group of squatters organised a "cavalcade" consisting of 18 armed men and three drays pulled by about 50 bullocks. At a location known as One Tree Hill, (now known as Tabletop Mountain, Queensland), near Toowoomba, the group was ambushed by Multuggerah and about 100 men, having been forced to stop at barricades previously erected by the attackers. The warriors held a corroborree after sacking the drays, feasting on bullock meat.

Retaliation attempt
The squatters organised a revenge party, comprising all of the men at the Inn, including servants, numbering between 35 and 50 men. They managed to surprise the group of Aboriginal people by arriving at their camp very early the next morning, and the two groups engaged in a full-on battle. Quite a number of Aboriginal people were wounded or killed, but the settlers were hindered by getting bogged in the mud, and one was wounded in the buttocks with a spear thrown by a woman. The majority of the remaining warriors staged a retreat up the steep slopes of the mountain, where they had stored heaps of boulders. They were then able to throw spears and stones and roll boulders down the slopes, wounding some of the squatters and shattering many of their muskets, until they were forced to retreat.

The squatters awaited the border police of Dr Simpson, but when the six men found the road barricaded again, decided not to attempt an attack on the warriors.

Aftermath
Following this defeat, there was an unusually large-scale response to the Battle of One Tree Hill. A campaign began to remove Multuggerah’s warriors out of the area. Dr Simpson gathered forces from Brisbane and Ipswich until he had a total of 35–45 men. The 16 station owners and overseers sent out a call, gathering 40 to 60 men. Eventually, about 75 to 100 settlers, including most of Moreton Bay’s soldiers and police, chased the warriors from the pass. Many were killed in the Lockyer Valley area.

Conflicts continued as the warriors camped in the Rosewood Scrub and Helidon Scrub areas and mounted raids on the settlers. In October 1843, using an Aboriginal tracker, the squatters found and stormed the camp, killing leaders (although apparently not Multuggerah) and many others. Attacks and raids in the area continued for another five years.

Legacy and memorials
A monument recording the battle was established in 2005.

An Indigenous land use agreement was signed over the site, between Toowoomba City Council and a body representing the Jagera, Yuggera and Ugarapul people as the traditional owners of the area, in 2008.

It depicts "11 squatters firing on a group of 25 Indigenous people of whom three appear to have been shot".

References

Further reading

External links 

 Taylor's sketch of the event

History of Indigenous Australians
Darling Downs
History of Queensland
1843 in Australia
One Tree Hill
September 1843 events